Charles Bradshaw (1805 – 18??) was a merchant and politician in colonial Victoria (Australia), a member of the Victorian Legislative Council.

Bradshaw was a merchant in Melbourne from 1843. He was an Auditor for Society of St George in 1845, manager of the Union Bank of Australia 1850-1852 and commissioner Savings Banks in 1859.

Bradshaw was a nominated member of the Victorian Legislative Council from 1 August 1854 replacing Andrew Knight. Bradshaw remained a member until the original unicameral Council was abolished in March 1856.

In December 1860, Bradshaw sailed for England.

References

 

1805 births
Year of death unknown
Members of the Victorian Legislative Council